Lindsey Stomp is the debut extended play (EP) released by American violinist and recording artist Lindsey Stirling. The EP was officially released on November 5, 2010, two months after Stirling's participation on the fifth season of America's Got Talent. The EP included three tracks ("Transcendence", "Song of the Caged Bird" and "Spontaneous Me") which would later be included on her debut studio album.

Track listing

References

2010 debut EPs
Instrumental EPs
Lindsey Stirling albums